Graešnica is a village in the Bitola Municipality of North Macedonia. It used to be part of the former municipality of Bistrica.

Demographics
According to the 2002 census, the village had a total of 190 inhabitants. Ethnic groups in the village include:

Albanians 172
Macedonians 17
Others 1

References

External links

Villages in Bitola Municipality
Albanian communities in North Macedonia